Pál Berendy (30 November 1932 – 4 September 2019)  was a Hungarian football midfielder who played for Hungary in the 1958 FIFA World Cup. He also played for Vasas SC.

References

External links
 FIFA profile

1932 births
2019 deaths
Hungarian footballers
Hungary international footballers
Association football midfielders
Vasas SC players
1958 FIFA World Cup players
Footballers from Budapest
20th-century Hungarian people